Darren Young (born 13 October 1978 in Glasgow) is a Scottish football coach and former player, who is currently the manager of Stirling Albion.

Over the course of his career he has also played for Aberdeen, Dundee, Dunfermline Athletic and Greenock Morton. Between his spells at Dundee and Morton, Young played two trial matches for Queen of the South.

Young has also managed several clubs, being in charge of Albion Rovers and East Fife in the Scottish lower leagues.

Playing career

Aberdeen
Young grew up in Whitlawburn, Cambuslang and attended Cathkin High School. He started his career at Aberdeen (where he was later to be joined by younger brother Derek), joining the senior squad after a loan spell at Crombie Sports on 29 February 1996. He made a quick impact, making his first team debut against Hearts in August 1996, aged only 17. Young's prodigious development which had seen him awarded several Scotland Under-21 caps was hindered however, by a serious knee injury which required three separate operations to repair.

Young made a successful return to the Aberdeen first team in 2000, by which stage his brother Derek was also an established member of Ebbe Skovdahl's resurgent side. Darren was soon awarded the captaincy and led the Dons to a 4th-place finish in the league in the 2001–02 season. This ensured European football returned to Pittodrie and Young increased his continental appearances to 10, as Aberdeen played FC Nistru Otaci and Hertha BSC Berlin in the 2002–03 UEFA Cup.

Dunfermline Athletic
Darren and his brother Derek both joined Dunfermline Athletic in July 2003, as part of Jimmy Calderwood's new-look side. They were part of the team defeated 3–1 by Celtic in the Scottish Cup Final at Hampden Park in May 2004. Young was once again blighted by injuries the following season but helped the Pars retain their SPL status in the 2005–06 season. They also reached the League Cup Final where Celtic again proved too strong – Young scored the winning goal in the semis, but did not play in that final due to a foot injury.

In July 2006, his brother was released by Dunfermline (eventually signing for St Johnstone), ensuring the Young brothers would play separately for the first time in their professional careers. In the 2007 Scottish Cup Final, Dunfermline and Young lost to Celtic in a major final for the third time in quick succession, with the player receiving the small consolation of the Man of the match award. The club had already been relegated from the top division weeks earlier.

After defeat in another cup final, this time in the 2007–08 Scottish Challenge Cup, in May 2008 Young rejected Dunfermline's final contract offer meaning he would leave East End Park after five years with the Pars.

Dundee
In May 2008, Young signed for First Division club Dundee. Young was sent off after three minutes into his debut for Dundee, during a league match against Clyde at Broadwood Stadium after pulling back an opponent. He was released by the club on 4 May 2010.

Later playing career
Young featured in two games as a trialist for Dumfries club Queen of the South early in the 2010–11 season, during the reign of Kenny Brannigan's management. In the second game for the Palmerston club he was substituted due to injury after 10 minutes. Young then went on trial at Greenock Morton after a spate of injuries to their midfield. He was offered training facilities and the possibility of trial matches. After playing well in his three games, he was signed until the end of the year. After a dozen league appearances, Young was released in May 2011.

Young signed for Alloa Athletic in July 2011. He was appointed captain and led the team to the Third Division title in the 2011–12 season.

International career

Young won seven Scotland under-21 caps. He also travelled with the Scotland squad to the 1998 FIFA World Cup as a hamper boy.

Coaching career

Albion Rovers
Young was appointed player/manager of League Two club Albion Rovers in June 2014. In his first match in charge, he scored the winning penalty as Albion Rovers beat Airdrieonians 4–2 on penalties following a 2–2 draw in the Scottish Challenge Cup on 26 July 2014. Young won the League Two championship and promotion in his first season as a manager, sealing the league with a 3–2 win against Clyde.

On getting his team promoted into League One, despite budget restraints and low expectations Young led Albion Rovers to their best start to a third tier season in the club's history, taking 28 points from their first 17 games and placed third. They finished the 2015–16 Scottish League One season in sixth place. Towards the end of the 2016–17 season, Albion Rovers announced that Young would leave the club as they had failed to agree a new contract.

East Fife
Shortly after leaving Albion Rovers, Young was appointed manager of Scottish League One club East Fife on 3 June 2017. He was sacked in November 2021, after a defeat against Clyde that left East Fife five points adrift at the bottom of League One.

Stirling Albion 
On 20 December 2021, Young was named as the new manager of Scottish League Two side Stirling Albion.

Career statistics

Managerial record

Honours and achievements

Player
Alloa Athletic
Scottish Third Division: 2011–12

Manager
Albion Rovers
Scottish League Two: 2014–15

Individual
Albion Rovers
SPFL League One Manager of the Month (1): October 2015
SPFL League Two Manager of the Month (1): November 2014

References

https://spfl.co.uk/news/east-fife-part-company-with-young

External links

Scotland U21 stats at Fitbastats
Profile and stats at AFC Heritage Trust

1978 births
Living people
Footballers from Glasgow
Sportspeople from Cambuslang
People educated at Cathkin High School
Scottish footballers
Association football midfielders
Scottish Premier League players
Aberdeen F.C. players
Dunfermline Athletic F.C. players
Queen of the South F.C. players
Dundee F.C. players
Greenock Morton F.C. players
Alloa Athletic F.C. players
Scottish Junior Football Association players
Scottish Football League players
Scotland under-21 international footballers
Scottish Professional Football League players
Scottish football managers
Albion Rovers F.C. players
Albion Rovers F.C. managers
East Fife F.C. managers
Scottish Professional Football League managers
Stirling Albion F.C. managers
Footballers from South Lanarkshire